Jacob Greene (born March 23, 2003) is an American soccer player who plays as a midfielder or defender for D.C. United in Major League Soccer.

Club career 
D.C. United signed Greene on November 25, 2020, making him the club's 15th homegrown signing.

International career
In November 2021, Greene represented the United States national under-20 team at the Revelations Cup.

Career statistics

Club

References

2003 births
Living people
American soccer players
Association football midfielders
D.C. United players
Loudoun United FC players
Homegrown Players (MLS)
Soccer players from Maryland
USL Championship players
United States men's under-20 international soccer players